Billian is a surname. Notable people with the surname include:

 Deborah Billian, American politician
 Hans Billian (born Hans Joachim Hubert, 1918–2007), German film director, screenwriter, and producer

See also
 Eusideroxylon zwageri